The 2003 Towson Tigers football team was an American football team that represented Towson University during the 2003 NCAA Division I-AA football season. In its final year of Patriot League competition, Towson finished fifth.

In their 12th year under head coach Gordy Combs, the Tigers compiled a 6–6 record. 

The Tigers were outscored 274 to 271. Their 3–4 conference record placed fifth out of eight in the Patriot League standings. 

This year marked Towson's seventh and final Patriot League campaign, as the Tigers had agreed in 2002 to join the Atlantic 10 Conference for football, starting with the 2004 season. Though they remained in Division I-AA, this move gave Towson a higher level of competition, more similarly sized schools, and the opportunity to award athletic scholarships. By joining the A-10, Towson would also gain football matchups with Delaware, Hofstra, James Madison and William & Mary, all A-10 football members that competed with Towson in other sports in their primary conference, the Colonial Athletic Association.

Towson played its home games at Johnny Unitas Stadium on the university campus in Towson, Maryland. The stadium had been built the previous year and started 2003 with the name Towson University Stadium; it was rededicated to honor the late Johnny Unitas on October 11, 2003. In addition to being a local celebrity from his tenure as quarterback of the Baltimore Colts, Unitas had also been the father of three Towson students and had led efforts to find a naming partner for the new Towson football stadium.

Schedule

References

Towson
Towson Tigers football seasons
Towson Tigers football